Yoon Jeong-yeon (born 9 November 1992) is a South Korean female taekwondo practitioner. She won a silver medal at the Asian Games in the women's 53 kg event.

References

1992 births
Living people
South Korean female taekwondo practitioners
Asian Games silver medalists for South Korea
Asian Games medalists in taekwondo
Taekwondo practitioners at the 2014 Asian Games
Medalists at the 2014 Asian Games
Asian Taekwondo Championships medalists
21st-century South Korean women